Richard Warden Sears Jr. (born April 22, 1943) is a Democratic member of the Vermont State Senate, representing the Bennington senate district.

Richard Sears was first elected to the Vermont State Senate in 1992 and continues to serve in that office.

Biography

Sears was born in Framingham, Massachusetts on April 22, 1943.  He attended school in Ashland, Massachusetts, followed by the New Hampton School in New Hampton, New Hampshire.  He went on to receive a B.A. degree from the University of Vermont in 1969.

He has resided in Bennington, Vermont since 1971, and is married to Beverly Sears (formerly Beverly Bushey).

He has worked in residential programs for troubled youth since the 1970s.

Public life

Sears served on the Bennington school board from 1987 to 1993 and was chairman for four of those years.

He was elected to the Vermont State Senate in 1992 and has been reelected in 1994, 1996, 1998, 2000, 2002, 2004, 2006, 2008, 2010, 2012, 2014, 2016, 2018, and 2020.

See also

Members of the Vermont Senate, 2005-2006 session
Members of the Vermont Senate, 2007-2008 session

External links
Vermont Senate Biographies

Democratic Party Vermont state senators
1943 births
Living people
People from Bennington, Vermont
People from Framingham, Massachusetts
School board members in Vermont
21st-century American politicians
New Hampton School alumni
University of Vermont alumni